The Guide Hachette des Vins is a French wine buying guide published by Hachette Livre (Hachette Pratique).  Its first edition was released in 1985.  It is France's best-selling wine guide and one of France's oldest. The Guide Hachette des Vins is considered to be France' most authoritative guide and commonly referred to as the bible of the French wine industry.

Blind tasting panels
The Guide Hachette uses blind tasting panels to evaluate wines by appellation. Each year 40,000 wines are tasted blind and rated by experts.

No fee is required to submit samples. Only the most recently bottled vintage is allowed to be submitted for blind tasting.

Wine tastings are organized locally in each region between January and May. Blind tasting sessions composed of a panel wine professionals (enologists, wine merchants, wine brokers, sommeliers) are organized with the Syndicat Viticole or Winegrower's Syndicate of each appellation present in the guide.

Rating system
Each wine is rated on a scale of 0 to 5.

The top rated wines are subject to a second round of blind tasting.  After the second tasting, the panel votes on one or two wines to receive Coup de Coeur [Judges' Favorite].  The Coup de Coeur is considered to be the highest recommendation.

Regions covered
The 2016 edition covers:

 Alsace and Lorraine
 Beaujolais and Lyonnais
 Bordeaux
 Burgundy
 Champagne
 Jura, Savoie, Bugey
 Languedoc and Roussillon
 Poitou and Charentes
 Provence and Corsica
 South-west France
 Loire Valley and Central
 Rhône Valley
 Vin de Pays/IGP (Indication géographique protégée)
 Luxembourg

References

French wine
Consumer guides